William Horlick Neukom (born 1942) is an American former managing general partner of the San Francisco Giants baseball team ownership group.  He held this position from May 2008 to December 31, 2011 and he was the managing partner when the Giants won the World Series in 2010, the first World Series win since the team had moved to California in 1958.  Prior to holding this position, he was President of the American Bar Association in 2007–08.  He was the principal legal counsel for Microsoft for almost 25 years.  He was also the Chairman of the law firm of Preston Gates & Ellis, LLP in Seattle, now part of K&L Gates. He is a Co-Founder & CEO of the World Justice Project.

Early life and education
Neukom was born in 1942, seven years before his brother, Daniel Neukom, who is a history teacher at Sacramento Country Day School. He was raised in the Bay Area community of San Mateo, California.  He was living in the Bay Area when the Giants moved to San Francisco in 1958.  He graduated from San Mateo High School in 1960.

After receiving an undergraduate degree from Dartmouth College in 1964, Neukom returned to the Bay Area where he received a law degree from Stanford Law School in 1967.

Legal career and Microsoft 
After completing his law degree, Neukom served as a clerk for Judge Theodore S. Turner of the King County Superior Court in Seattle in the years 1967–68.

By 1977, he had joined the Seattle law firm Shidler, McBroom, Gates & Lucas (later Preston Gates & Ellis). Neukom's relationship with Microsoft began in 1978 when managing partner Bill Gates Sr. asked him to advise his son's fledgling software business. Neukom started doing legal work for Microsoft when the company had just 12 employees. He would continue to be Microsoft's lead legal counsel for nearly 25 years.

Neukom joined Microsoft as an employee in 1985 and thereafter built its corporate law department from an initial staff of five to more than 600 attorneys and support personnel. He became an Executive Vice President at Microsoft. He spent 17 years as Microsoft's general counsel and chief legal officer, managing the company's legal, governmental affairs and philanthropic activities.

He was actively involved in legally defending Microsoft's intellectual property in several countries, most notably in Apple v. Microsoft. He also was involved in defending Microsoft from a series of complex antitrust suits (i.e. United States v. Microsoft). Neukom presided over Microsoft's defeat by the U.S. Department of Justice in a case that was referred to as the "trial of the century." While at Microsoft, Neukom also directed the company's community affairs program, which initiated corporate giving programs including the Microsoft Giving Campaign, the Microsoft Matching Gifts Program, and the Microsoft Volunteer Program.  In 2002 Neukom retired from Microsoft as Executive Vice President, Law & Corporate Affairs.

After Microsoft, Neukom returned to Preston Gates & Ellis as a partner in the firm's business law practice. In January 2004 he was named chair of that firm.  In 2007 Preston Gates & Ellis merged with Kirkpatrick and Lockhart of Pittsburgh to form the large law firm now named K&L Gates. Neukom no longer is affiliated with the firm.

Neukom served as president of the American Bar Association for a one-year term from August 2007 to August 2008.

San Francisco Giants
Neukom had been an investor in the Giants since 1995 and on May 16, 2008 was named the new Managing General Partner for the Giants. He succeeded Peter Magowan, who retired at the end of the 2008 season at the age of 66. Neukom and other investors purchased a portion of Peter Magowan's ownership interest in the team. Neukom became the lead active investor of the team following the reduction of Magowan's ownership interest, the death of Harmon Burns (a leading investor who died in 2006) and the death of Sue Burns, who died in 2009.

On September 14, 2011, Bill Neukom announced he was retiring as the Managing General Partner and CEO of the San Francisco Giants effective January 1, 2012, and he would be succeeded by Giants executive Larry Baer. The San Jose Mercury reported anonymous sources saying that Neukom was forced out due to differences in the ownership group on how to divide up the additional money earned after the Giants won the 2010 World Series. The Mercury also reported Giants shareholder Charles Bartlett Johnson purchased additional interests in the team, becoming the largest individual shareholder at 25%.

Philanthropic work
Between 1996 and 2007, Neukom was a member of the Board of Trustees of Dartmouth College, and he served as chair of the board from 2004 to 2007.  Three of his children have attended Dartmouth. He is the founding donor of the Neukom Institute for Computational Science at Dartmouth College, which aims to advance computing resources and applications in multiple aspects of the Dartmouth curriculum.

In 2006 Neukom committed to a gift of $20 million for the planned construction of a new academic building at Stanford University's law school.

World Justice Project
Neukom is the co-founder, president, and CEO of the World Justice Project, which works internationally to strengthen the rule of law, aiming to promote the development of communities of opportunity and equity.

References

External links
"Meet Bill Neukom," San Francisco Chronicle, May 18, 2008.
ABA Website
Giants Front Office – SF Giants website

Major League Baseball owners
San Francisco Giants owners
American lawyers
American philanthropists
Presidents of the American Bar Association
Living people
1942 births
Stanford Law School alumni
Dartmouth College alumni
People from San Mateo, California
Microsoft employees
American chief executives of professional sports organizations
American business executives
The Asia Foundation